"Vast right-wing conspiracy" is a phrase popularized by a 1995 memo by political opposition researcher Chris Lehane and then referenced in 1998 by the then First Lady of the United States Hillary Rodham Clinton, in defense of her husband, President Bill Clinton, characterizing the continued allegations of scandal against her and her husband, including the Lewinsky scandal, as part of a conspiracy by Clinton's political enemies. The term has been used since, including in a question posed to Bill Clinton in 2009 to describe verbal attacks on Barack Obama during his early presidency. Hillary Clinton mentioned it again during her 2016 presidential campaign.

Earlier uses
While popularized by Mrs. Clinton in her 1998 TODAY Show interview, the phrase did not originate with her.  In 1991 the Detroit News wrote:

An Associated Press story in 1995 also used the phrase, relating an official's guess that the Oklahoma City bombing was the work of "maybe five malcontents" and not "some kind of vast right-wing conspiracy."

1995 memo
A 332-page memo titled "Communication Stream of Conspiracy Commerce" was commissioned by Mark Fabiani and written by Chris Lehane in 1995. It was the first document to describe the conspiracies surrounding the Clintons, which Hillary Clinton later popularized with the term "vast right-wing conspiracy." It described how online conservative media outlets such as The American Spectator spread conspiracy theories about the suicide of Vince Foster, the Whitewater controversy, and other events. According to the memo, these conspiracies spread from conservative think tanks to British tabloids, and then to the mainstream press.

The Today Show interview

In response to ongoing accusations surrounding the Clintons' investment in a real estate development known as Whitewater in the late 1970s and early 1980s, Clinton's Attorney General Janet Reno had appointed an independent counsel, Kenneth Starr, to investigate those accusations in 1994.  Starr's investigation began to branch out into other issues, from Filegate to Travelgate to Bill Clinton's actions in the civil case of his alleged sexual harassment of Paula Jones prior to his presidency.  In the course of the last of these, White House intern Monica Lewinsky signed an affidavit that she had not had a relationship with Clinton, but Lewinsky's confidant Linda Tripp had been recording their phone conversations and offered Starr tapes of Lewinsky describing her feelings for, and alleging intimate encounters with, the president.  The president was asked to give a deposition, and accusations that he lied about an affair under oath first made national headlines on January 17, 1998, when the story was picked up by the conservative-right e-mail newsletter The Drudge Report.  Despite swift denials from President Clinton, the media attention grew.

On January 27, 1998, Hillary Clinton appeared on NBC's The Today Show, in an interview with Matt Lauer.

Clinton elaborated by decrying the tactics "and the kind of intense political agenda at work here".  Bob Woodward recounts in his book The Agenda (1994) that the then-first lady claimed that when her husband was making his decision to run for the presidency in 1991, he reported receiving "a direct threat from someone in the Bush White House, warning that if he ran, the Republicans would go after him. 'We will do everything we can to destroy you personally,' she recalled that the Bush White House man had said."

Later uses
David Brock, a conservative-turned-liberal author, has said he was once a part of an effort to dredge up a scandal against Clinton. In 1993 Brock, then of the American Spectator, was the first to report Paula Jones' claims. As Brock explained in Blinded by the Right, after learning more about the events and conservative payments surrounding Paula Jones he personally apologized to the Clintons. He documented his experience in Blinded by the Right: The Conscience of an Ex-Conservative, wherein he alleged that Arkansas state troopers had taken money in exchange for testimony against Clinton which Brock had published in a previous book. Adam Curtis also discusses the concept in his documentary series The Power of Nightmares.  Brock has agreed with Clinton's claim that there was a "right wing conspiracy" to smear her husband, quibbling only with the characterization of it as "vast", since Brock contends that it was orchestrated mainly by a few powerful people. MSNBC also described the comment as once-ridiculed but now taken more seriously by "many Democrats" who point "to the well-documented efforts by conservative financier Richard Mellon Scaife to fund a network of anti-Clinton investigations."

Specific claims of such funding have been made against conservative Republican supporter and billionaire Richard Mellon Scaife.  Scaife played a major role in funding the Arkansas Project investigating President Clinton; former Clinton White House Counsel Lanny Davis claimed Scaife was using his money "to destroy a president of the United States."  Scaife claims to be public about his political spending (q.v.). CNN stated in a study the news outlet conducted on Scaife, "If it's a conspiracy, it's a pretty open one."

Hillary Clinton wrote in her 2003 autobiography, "Looking back, I see that I might have phrased my point more artfully, but I stand by the characterization of Starr's investigation [regardless of the truth about Lewinsky]." By 2007 her experiences caused Hillary Clinton to say in presidential campaign appearances that the vast right-wing conspiracy was back, citing such cases as the 2002 New Hampshire Senate election phone jamming scandal. On the stump for Al Franken's 2008 Senate campaign, Bill Clinton acknowledged his Air America Radio show by quipping that he had been taking on the "vast right wing conspiracy before others even acknowledged that it existed".

Former President Clinton, when asked on Meet the Press (September 27, 2009) whether the vast right wing conspiracy was involved in the attacks on President Barack Obama, said "Oh, you bet.  Sure it is.  It's not as strong as it was, because America's changed demographically, but it's as virulent as it was ... when they accused me of murder and all that stuff."

Two other figures who have used the phrase are Nobel laureate economist Paul Krugman and journalist Joe Conason. Conason, in an article called "The vast right-wing conspiracy is back," refers the National Republican Trust PAC and Newsmax Media, which are run by former foes of Bill Clinton and who made attacks on then-President Barack Obama.  The National Republican Trust PAC sponsored a campaign commercials against Obama in 2008 which FactCheck.org described as "one of the sleaziest false TV ads of the campaign."  One of Newsmax Media's owners "was among the most insistent endorsers of the Obama birth certificate myth" and a popularizer of  the canard that Bill Clinton's White House counsel Vince Foster did not commit suicide—as determined by five official investigations—but was murdered.

In some of his books, Krugman has used the phrase ("Yes, Virginia, there is a vast right-wing conspiracy") to refer not to a conservative Republican-leaning campaign against Clinton (or Obama), but more generally to "an interlocking set of institutions ultimately answering to a small group of people that collectively reward loyalists and punish dissenters" in the service of "movement conservatism."  The network of institutions provide

obedient politicians with the resources to win elections, safe havens in the event of defeat, and lucrative career opportunities after they leave office. They guarantee favorable news coverage to politicians who follow the party line, while harassing and undermining opponents. And they support a large standing army of party intellectuals and activists.

In Krugman's view, the network of foundations that fund conservative scholarship, the national and regional think tanks and advocacy groups, talk radio media outlets, and conservative law firms through which they pushed their agenda to move the Republican Party to the right, far surpass in funding, size, inter-connectedness or influence anything the Democratic Party or the American political left/liberal movement have at their disposal.

2014 reemergence 
In April 2014, the Clinton Presidential Center published the original 1995 memo on the alleged conspiracy. The memo's author, Chris Lehane, wrote, "As for the premise of the memo, I absolutely stand by it. Not only was it right about the right wing then, it is more accurate than ever today."

2016 reemergence 
In 2016, Hillary Clinton said she still believed in the "vast right-wing conspiracy", adding that it was "even better funded" 18 years later. However, she opined, "At this point it's probably not correct to say it's a conspiracy because it's out in the open."

In October, after footage of Donald Trump boasting about his sexual exploits emerged and multiple women accused Trump of sexual misconduct, Melania Trump defended her husband and said, "This was all organized from the opposition." Writers for the Los Angeles Times and The Washington Post noted that Melania's response "echoed" Hillary's original use of the phrase "vast right-wing conspiracy."

Use in popular culture
After the release of a deposition Bill Clinton had given to the Independent Counsel in which he perjured himself, some conservatives began to adopt the VRWC phrasing ironically. In 2004, conservative lawyer Mark W. Smith wrote the New York Times Best Seller Official Handbook of the Vast Right-Wing Conspiracy, which came with a "membership card" that made its owner an "official member of the VRWC."  Similarly, a number of newspaper, magazine, and website articles have used the phrase to report on left-wing politics. 

Eugene Volokh's blog The Volokh Conspiracy is said to have derived its name from as a reference to the "Vast right-wing conspiracy" statement.

The term "Vast Right Wing Conspiracy" continues to be mocked by conservatives.

See also
Clinton crazies
Basket of deplorables

References

Notes

Sources

Further reading

External links
Transcript of Hillary Clinton interview on NBC Today Show
Who's funding the Conservative Movement?

Media coverage
Video: Hillary Clinton Speaks Out on Lewinsky Allegations via NBC Today Show, January 27, 1998
Hillary Clinton: 'This Is A Battle', CNN, January 27, 1998
Washington Post: First Lady Launches Counterattack, The Washington Post, January 28, 1998
Caught In The Whitewater Net, CBS News, May 19, 1998 
It's no accident that Coors is the right beer in America, undated
The Vast Right-Wing Conspiracy 2011: Less Vast- More Powerful, Rick Ungar, Forbes, March 21, 2011
Why Not Occupy Newsrooms?, October 24, 2011

American political catchphrases
Conspiracy theories by subject
Conspiracy theories in the United States
English phrases
Hillary Clinton
Clinton–Lewinsky scandal
Political terminology of the United States
Right-wing politics